"You Need Love" is a song with lyrics written by American blues musician Willie Dixon.  The instrumentation was first recorded by slide guitarist Earl Hooker with backing musicians. Chicago blues artist Muddy Waters later overdubbed vocals and Chess Records released it as a single in 1962.

The song has since been covered by other artists, including the Small Faces, retitled "You Need Loving". Led Zeppelin subsequently adapted aspects from both renditions for their 1969 hit "Whole Lotta Love", which prompted Dixon to file a lawsuit against them in 1985, after his daughter heard it.

Muddy Waters song

Background 
Similar to his previous single, "You Shook Me", Muddy Waters dubbed his vocals onto a backing track, a formula also followed for "Little Brown Bird" and "Black Angel". In July 1962, Chess Records owner Leonard Chess contacted blues slide guitarist Earl Hooker to record additional tunes for a new record by Waters. However, Waters was on tour in Ohio, and during his absence, Hooker and the group cut three instrumental backing tracks.  Besides Hooker and organist Big Moose Walker, there are different accounts of who provided the instrumental backing. On October 12, 1962, Waters overdubbed his vocals. Of the three recordings cut that day, "Black Angel" remains unissued.

The vocals are apparently derived from several earlier songs by Waters, such as "Rollin' Stone", "Still a Fool" and "She's Alright". The song is based on a guitar riff in the key of E minor. Marie Dixon, Willie Dixon's wife insists that the songs is specially about her:

Release 
Chess first released the song on a 7-inch single, backed with "Little Brown Bird" in 1962. Although a November 10, 1962, review in Billboard indicated its sales potential, the single failed to reach the magazine's charts. In the United Kingdom, the single was subsequently withdrawn and replaced by a four-track EP with "Little Brown Bird", "You Shook Me" and "Muddy Waters Twist". The EP was a favorite of Jimmy Page and Jeff Beck during their teenage years.

Personnel 
 Muddy Waters – lead vocals
 Earl Hooker – guitar
 John 'Big Moose' Walker – organ

Additional musicians may include:
 A.C. Reed – tenor sax
 Jackie Brenston – baritone sax
 Ernest Cotton – sax
 Earnest Johnson or Willie Dixon – bass
 Casey Jones or Bobby Little – drums
 Lafayette Leake – piano
 Unidentified – overdubbed percussion (Mbira)

Small Faces version 

Three years after its initial release, East London band Small Faces released the track as "You Need Loving" for their eponymous debut album in 1966. The tune, which was a largely improvisational jam by the group, had been a part of their live repertoire along with other rhythm and blues songs since they formed, and was therefore popular with the mod subculture of the 1960s. At the time, their setlist consisted of about five songs, two originals by Steve Marriott and Ronnie Lane, "E Too D and "Come On Children". The remaining songs were "Ooh Poo Pah Doo","Baby Don't You Do It" and "You Need Love". It is also noteworthy for 19-year old Marriott's raw vocals, one of his most well known characteristics.

The opening verse of the Muddy Waters' original was not included anywhere in "You Need Loving", with the Small Faces adding their own bits instead, such as "Eeny, meeny, miny, moe" and "I can't monkey and I can't dog. Can't do the monkey, yeah"

In fact, the majority of the track was re-written in order to better fit Marriott's style of singing. The first verse was completely remade by replacing it with an altered version of the last verse found in "You Need Love":

Despite containing several verses found in the original, on original 1966 pressings of the group's debut album, it is only credited to Marriott and Ronnie Lane. Allegedly, this was a business tactic used by Small Faces manager Don Arden in order to get more royalties. In fact, Arden kept the royalties himself, with the band earning only £20 a week, despite multiple top ten entries on the UK Singles Chart. Dixon did not sue Arden or the band, because he did not know of its existence. On most later reissues of the album, Dixon is credited as a songwriter. The group recorded the song live for Saturday Club and can be found on the compilation album The BBC Sessions.

Personnel 
 Steve Marriott – lead vocals, lead guitar
 Ronnie Lane – bass guitar, backing vocals
 Ian McLagan –  Hammond organ, backing vocals
 Kenney Jones – drums

Similarities with "Whole Lotta Love" 

In 1969, Led Zeppelin recorded "Whole Lotta Love", a song with some similar lyrics and melody line. It was largely conceived by Jimmy Page, but is credited to the entire band. Lyrically however, the song refers to "You Need Love"

Vocally, lead singer Robert Plant phrases the song in the style of Marriott, similar to "You Need Loving". Marriott said, "He sang it the same, phrased it the same, even the stops at the end were the same". Marriott said both Page and Plant attended Small Faces concerts: "That’s where Jimmy Page and Robert Plant heard it. Robert Plant used to follow us around. He was like a fan."

Plant eventually apologised to Marriott in a backstage encounter during the 1970s. However, Marriott liked "Whole Lotta Love", and the first time he heard it he reportedly shouted "Go on, my son!" In 1985, Dixon filed a lawsuit against the group after his daughter brought it to his attention.

The case was eventually settled out of court and on all reissues of Led Zeppelin II, Dixon is credited as a co-writer on the track. Page has repeatedly objected to claims that the composition was plagiarized, insisting that only the lyrics were.

Plant later complained,

Other covers 
 English blues rock band Savoy Brown covered the song for their second studio album Getting to the Point in 1968. It is considered one of the better songs on the album.
 The Hoochie Coochie Men with Deep Purple keyboardist Jon Lord recorded the song live on February 3, 2003 for their 2003 live album Live At The Basement.
 Peter Green's Fleetwood Mac covered the song, and it was released on the album called The Complete Unreleased BBC Anthology 1967-1968.

See also 
 List of songs that have been the subject of plagiarism disputes
 List of Led Zeppelin songs written or inspired by others

Notes

Citations

References

External links 
 Willie Dixon official website
 Muddy Waters official website

Songs written by Willie Dixon
Muddy Waters songs
Small Faces songs
1962 songs
Chess Records singles
Songs involved in plagiarism controversies